Henry Sanders (1807–1888) was a Church of England priest, most notably Archdeacon of Exeter from 1875 until his death.

Sanders was born in Exeter and educated at Christ Church, Oxford, holding incumbencies in Langtree and Otterton. He was Head Master of Blundell's School from 1834; and Rector of Sowton from then until his death on 24 June 1888.

References

1807 births
1888 deaths
19th-century English Anglican priests
Alumni of Christ Church, Oxford
Archdeacons of Exeter
Heads of Blundell's School